Korea national football team may refer to:

 North Korea national football team, the men's association football team representing North Korea
 North Korea women's national football team, the women's association football team representing North Korea
 South Korea national football team, the men's association football team representing South Korea
 South Korea women's national football team, the women's association football team representing South Korea
 Korea Unified football team, unified association football team of players from both North Korea and South Korea at the 1991 FIFA World Youth Championship
 South Korea national American football team, the American football team representing South Korea